Charles Pearson (1793–1862) was Solicitor to the City of London and promoter of London's first underground railway.

Charles Pearson may also refer to:
 The Hon Charles Anthony Pearson (born 1956), Scottish landowner and owner of Dunecht Estates
 Charles Henry Pearson (1830–1894), historian and Australian politician
 Charles Pearson, Lord Pearson (1843–1910), Scottish politician and judge
 Charles Pearson (British Army officer) (1834–1909), British colonel in the Zulu war
 Charlie Pearson, Australian rules footballer
 Charles L. Pearson (1860–1918), Wisconsin state senator
 Charles William Pearson (1847–1917), pioneer Anglican missionary in Uganda